Gibraltar competed at the 2022 Commonwealth Games in Birmingham, England between 28 July and 8 August 2022. Having made its Games debut in 1958, it was Gibraltar's seventeenth appearance to date.

Cyclist Derek Barbara and weightlifter Holly O'Shea were the country's flagbearers during the opening ceremony.

Competitors
Gibraltar received a quota of 22 open allocation slots from Commonwealth Sport. This quota is used to determine the overall team in sports lacking a qualifying system. 

The following is the list of number of competitors participating at the Games per sport/discipline.

Athletics

One athlete was officially selected on 5 April 2022.

Men
Track and road events

Cycling

Seven cyclists were officially selected on 5 April 2022.

Road
Men

Women

Mountain Biking

Gymnastics

One gymnast was officially selected on 5 April 2022.

Rhythmic
Individual Qualification

Squash

One player was officially selected on 5 April 2022.

Swimming

Five swimmers were officially selected on 5 April 2022.

Men

Women

Triathlon

Three triathletes were officially selected on 5 April 2022.

Weightlifting

One weightlifter qualified through their position in the IWF Commonwealth Ranking List (as of 9 March 2022). This will mark the country's sport debut at the Commonwealth Games.

References

External links
Team Gibraltar Facebook site

Nations at the 2022 Commonwealth Games
Gibraltar at the Commonwealth Games
2022 in Gibraltarian sport